Apollo Chen, also known as Chen Shei-saint (born 28 September 1957) is a Taiwanese journalist and politician.

Education and early career
Born in Taipei, Chen attended Jianguo High School, and earned a bachelor's degree in political science from National Taiwan University, followed by a master's in Chinese studies at Tamkang University. He wrote for the China Daily News and China Times and was also a television anchor on Asia Television.

Political career
Chen served on the Taipei City Council from 1991 to 1998. His first stint in the Legislative Yuan began the next year and lasted until 2005. Chen was the spokesman of Lien Chan's 2000 presidential campaign. In between legislative stints, he was the director of the Taoyuan County Cultural Affairs Bureau. Chen, backed by the Kuomintang, ran for the legislature again in the Taoyuan County by-election of 2010, losing to Huang Jen-shu by approximately 3,000 votes. He returned to the legislature in 2012. In 2014, Chen was suspended from the Kuomintang for casting a vote against the Land Administration Agent Act. However, the censure did not prevent him from running for reelection in 2016, which he won. It was initially reported that Chen had defeated  by 390 votes. A recount by the Taoyuan District Court revealed that Chen had won by 389 votes.

2016 KMT chairmanship election
His party's presidential candidate, Eric Chu, was not successful and subsequently resigned the KMT chairmanship. Chen declared his interest in the position a few days after Chu's resignation was finalized. On 22 February, Chen submitted a petition of 24,179 signatures to the party committee responsible for overseeing elections. The party confirmed 10,710 of those signatures, validating his candidacy. Chen finished fourth in the election, which was won by Hung Hsiu-chu.

2018 Taoyuan mayor election

References

External links

 

1957 births
Living people
Taoyuan City Members of the Legislative Yuan
Taipei Members of the Legislative Yuan
Kuomintang Members of the Legislative Yuan in Taiwan
National Taiwan Normal University alumni
Tamkang University alumni
Taiwanese journalists
Members of the 4th Legislative Yuan
Members of the 5th Legislative Yuan
Members of the 8th Legislative Yuan
Members of the 9th Legislative Yuan
Taipei City Councilors